Polyglycitol syrup has uses as a food additive, and is also known as E964.

References

E-number additives
Sugar substitutes